The Italpark was a theme park in Argentina, which was located where currently is the Parque Thays (del Libertador corner Callao avenues) in the Recoleta neighbourhood of Buenos Aires. It became a landmark of Buenos Aires in its 30 years of existence.

History

Crisis and demise 

On 29 July 1990, one of the wagons of the ride Matter Horn broke, and in the incident a 15-year-old girl named Roxana Celia Alaimo died, and her friend Karina Benítez was severely wounded.

Four months later, the city mayor Carlos Grosso ordered the definitive closure of Italpark.

See also 
 Parque de la Ciudad
 Parque Thays
 Shopping Sur
 Parque de la Costa

References

External links 
 
 

Amusement parks in Argentina
Defunct amusement parks
1960 establishments in Argentina
Amusement parks opened in 1960
Amusement parks closed in 1990
1990 disestablishments in Argentina